David Abercrombie Donaldson (1916–1996) was a 20th century Scottish artist who served as official Painter and Limner to Her Majesty the Queen in Scotland, an ancient title of the Scottish Court.

Life

Donaldson was born in Chryston in Lanarkshire in 1916 but raised in Coatbridge, where his family worked in the rolling mills. He attended Coatdyke Primary School and was raised in the Baptist Church.

He studied at Glasgow School of Art from 1932–37 and won the Director’s Prize in 1936. He was awarded the Glasgow School of Art Haldane Travelling Scholarship in 1937 and went abroad for the first time in his life to visit Paris and Florence. When Donaldson returned to Glasgow he undertook another year of study at Glasgow School of Art, the equivalent of a post-graduate year awarded to outstanding students on completion of their diploma.

The Empire Exhibition of 1938 was held in Glasgow’s Bellahouston Park. Scotland’s schools of art were employed to decorate pavilions and Donaldson painted a large scale mural which did not survive the demolition of the exhibition.

With the declaration of war in 1939 Donaldson was excused military service. He continued to teach his night-school classes but as staff from the art school went off to serve in the forces he graduated to teaching first and second year students. In 1941 he won the important Guthrie Award at the Royal Scottish Academy's annual exhibition. In 1942 he married Kathleen Maxwell, illustrator and actress,  and in 1943 their son, David, was born.  Their marriage was short and after their divorce he married Maria Krystyna Mora-Szorc in 1948, a pianist and painter, born in Warsaw in 1929 and with whom he had two daughters, Sally and Caroline.

Eventually, in 1944 he was appointed a full-time lecturer and a permanent member of staff at Glasgow School of Art. He was appointed Head of Drawing and Painting at the Glasgow School of Art in 1967.

He was elected an Associate Member of the Royal Scottish Academy in 1951 and a full Member in 1956. He was elected member of the Royal Society of Portrait Painters in 1964. The University of Strathclyde and the University of Glasgow both conferred honorary degrees upon him.

David Donaldson died during his 80th Birthday Retrospective Exhibition which was held firstly at the University of Edinburgh's Talbot Rice Gallery and then the Glasgow School of Art in August1996. This was also the year in which he was awarded the City of Glasgow Lord Provost’s Award for the Visual Arts and his biography by W. Gordon Smith was published.

Known Works

Donaldson was commissioned to paint the Queen in 1966. He was appointed Painter and Limner to Her Majesty the Queen in Scotland in 1977. Amongst his other notable subjects were Prime Minister Margaret Thatcher and many prominent figures in Scottish public life, such as Sir John Greig Dunbar, Lord Provost of Edinburgh.

His work is represented in public collections worldwide.

References

External links
 

1996 deaths
1916 births
20th-century Scottish painters
Scottish male painters
20th-century Scottish male artists